Ishii Dam is an earthfill dam located in Yamaguchi prefecture in Japan. The dam is used for irrigation and water supply. The catchment area of the dam is 2.3 km2. The dam impounds about 12  ha of land when full and can store 1160 thousand cubic meters of water. The construction of the dam was started on 1972 and completed in 1992.

References

Dams in Yamaguchi Prefecture
1992 establishments in Japan